Park City Jazz Festival is a jazz festival held at the Deer Valley Resort in Park City, Utah. Artists featured at the festival have included Papa Grows Funk and Esperanza Spalding.

External links
 Official Website

Jazz festivals in the United States